The men's épée fencing competition at the 2008 Summer Olympics in Beijing took place on August 10 at the Olympic Green Convention Centre. There were 41 competitors from 23 nations. The event was won by Matteo Tagliariol of Italy, the nation's first victory in the event since 1960 (the last of six consecutive wins) and first medal of any color since 1968. It was Italy's seventh overall victory, most among nations. The silver medal went to Fabrice Jeannet of France. José Luis Abajo earned Spain's first men's individual épée medal with his bronze. The Russian fencers' streak of five Games on the podium (including Russian fencers for the Soviet Union in 1988 and Unified Team in 1992) ended.

Background

This was the 25th appearance of the event, which was not held at the first Games in 1896 (with only foil and sabre events held) but has been held at every Summer Olympics since 1900.

Three of the eight quarterfinalists from 2004 returned: silver medalist Wang Lei of China, fifth-place finisher Fabrice Jeannet of France, and sixth-place finisher Silvio Fernández of Venezuela. The reigning (2007) World Champion was Krisztián Kulcsár of Hungary. Wang had won in 2006.

For only the second time in Olympic history (after 1932), no nations made their debut in the event. France and the United States each appeared for the 23rd time, tied for most among nations.

Qualification

Nations had been limited to three fencers each since 1928. However, the 2008 Games introduced a rotation of men's team fencing events with one weapon left off each Games; the individual event without a corresponding team event had the number of fencers per nation reduced to two. Men's foil was the first event to which this applied to, so the 2008 individual épée competition continued to allow three fencers per nation.

There were 39 dedicated quota spots for men's épée. The 24 fencers from the 8 teams qualified for the team event were all automatically qualified for the individual event. Next, the top 3 men in the FIE Individual Ranking received spots. After that, 7 more men were selected from the ranking based on continents: 2 from Europe, 2 from the Americas, 2 from Asia/Oceania, and 1 from Africa; each nation could only earn one spot from this continental ranking, but it could be added to any spots from the world ranking (up to three total). Finally, five spots were allocated by continental qualifying events: 2 from Europe, 1 from the Americas, 1 from Asia/Oceania, and 1 from Africa. Nations could only earn one spot from these events and only if they had no fencer qualified through rankings.

Additionally, there were 8 host/invitational spots that could be spread throughout the various fencing events. China used only 2 of those places to max out its representation in all events (both in the men's épée, for which only Wang Lei qualified directly), so 6 spots were assigned by Tripartite Commission invitation. None were used in the men's épée, so the total number of competitors was 41: the 39 dedicated places plus 2 host places.

Competition format

The épée competition, following the format introduced in 1996, consisted of a six-round single-elimination bracket with a bronze medal match between the two semifinal losers. Fencing was done to 15 touches or to the completion of three three-minute rounds if neither fencer reached 15 touches by then. At the end of time, the higher-scoring fencer was the winner; a tie resulted in an additional one-minute sudden-death time period. This sudden-death period was further modified by the selection of a draw-winner beforehand; if neither fencer scored a touch during the minute, the predetermined draw-winner won the bout.

Schedule

All times are China Standard Time (UTC+8)

Results

Section 1

Section 2

Section 3

Section 4

Finals

Final classification

References

 Competition format

External links
Official site for men's épée

Fencing at the 2008 Summer Olympics
Men's events at the 2008 Summer Olympics